Live at the Rainbow 1973 is a live album by the British glam rock band Sweet, released in 1999. The album is a recording of a concert at the Rainbow Theatre, London on 21 December 1973.

This release marks the first time the Rainbow Theatre concert has been available in its entirety, seven of the tracks having been previously available on Sweet's 1975 double album Strung Up.

Mono recording 
Two recordings were made of the Rainbow Theatre show, a multitrack recording and a mono recording direct from the mixing console. Unfortunately, Mick Tucker's snare drum was missing from the multitrack, and he later overdubbed the snare drum in the studio on the seven tracks that were released in stereo on the album Strung Up.

As the unused tracks from the concert were not overdubbed; the only version of the complete concert with the snare drum was the mono recording, which is the recording used for this CD.

Track listing

References

The Sweet albums
1999 live albums
Albums produced by Phil Wainman